Wheel bearing may refer to:

Ball bearing
Bearing (mechanical)
Fluid bearing
Jewel bearing
Journal bearing
Needle roller bearing
Plain bearing
Rolling-element bearing
Self-aligning ball bearing
Spherical roller bearing
Tapered roller bearing
Thrust bearing